Otto Reislant (31 May 1883 – 28 January 1968) was a German international footballer.

References

1883 births
1968 deaths
Association football forwards
German footballers
Germany international footballers